Halyna Makarivna Hnatyuk (1927-2016) was a Ukrainian linguist, lexicographer, historian of Ukrainian language, doctor of philological sciences. She was a research fellow of the Potebnia Institute of Linguistics in 1956-1992.

Hnatyuk is primarily accredited as co-editor and co-author of the Ukrainian language dictionary published in 1970s. In 1983 all members of the Potebnia Institute of Lingual Studies who worked on the dictionary including Hnatyuk received the USSR State Prize.

She was a wife of Ukrainian singer Dmytro Hnatyuk.

Published works
 Russian-Ukrainian literary and lingual relations in the second half of the 18th century – the first quarter of the 19th century. Kiev, 1957 [Російсько-українські літературно-мовні зв’язки в другій половині XVIII – першій чверті XIX ст. К., 1957]; 
 Russian-Ukrainian technical dictionary. Kiev, 1961 (co-author) [Російсько-український технічний словник. К., 1961 (співавт.)]; 
 Questions of terminology. Moscow, 1961 (co-author) [Вопросы терминологии. Москва, 1961 (співавт.)]; 
 Philosophical questions of linguistics. Kiev, 1972 (co-author) [Філософські питання мовознавства. К., 1972 (співавт.)]; 
 Word and phraseology in dictionary. Kiev, 1980 [Слово і фразеологізм у словнику. К., 1980]; 
 Participle in the modern Ukrainian literal language. Kiev, 1982 [Дієприкметник у сучасній українській літературній мові. К., 1982].

External links
 Zhelezniak, M.H. Hnatyuk Halyna Makarivna (ГНАТЮ́К Галина Макарівна). Encyclopedia of Modern Ukraine.

1927 births
2016 deaths
People from Cherkasy Oblast
Ukrainian philologists
Women philologists
Ukrainian lexicographers
Taras Shevchenko National University of Kyiv alumni
Academic staff of the Taras Shevchenko National University of Kyiv
Members of the National Academy of Sciences of Ukraine
Recipients of the USSR State Prize
Ukrainian women historians
Historians of Ukraine